Pro Patria may refer to:

Organisations
Royal Swedish Pro Patria Society, a Swedish patriotic and charitable organization founded in 1798
Pro Patria (Switzerland), a Swiss patriotic and charitable organization founded in 1909 
Pro Patria (Estonian political party), an Estonian political party

Distinctions
Pro Patria Medal (South Africa), a South African military campaign medal
Pro Patria Medal (Poland), a civil state decoration of Poland

Culture
Pro Patria (Coates) (1917), a pamphlet of poetry by Florence Earle Coates published in support of American involvement in World War I
Pro Patria, a large bronze sculpture at the Indiana World War Memorial Plaza
Pro Patria Finlandia, the ninth full-length studio album by the band Impaled Nazarene
Pro Patria (album), an album by Signal Aout 42

Sports
Aurora Pro Patria 1919, an Italian football club
Pro Patria Milano, an Italian athletics club

See also
National Pro Patria Party, a defunct Salvadoran political party.
Dulce et decorum est pro patria mori, a line from the Roman poet Horace